Gelechia turangella is a moth of the family Gelechiidae. It is found in the Kyzyl Kum desert in Kazakhstan and Uzbekistan.

References

Moths described in 1989
Gelechia